Nelson Mazivisa is a Zimbabwean professional footballer, who plays as a forward for Triangle United and the Zimbabwe national team.

Career

Club
Mazivisa's career began in Zvishavane with Platinum, he stayed with Platinum for five years up until 2016 when he left following the expiration of his contract. During his time with Platinum, Mazivisa was loaned out to Shabanie Mine in 2012. His spell with the aforementioned club was a success as he finished the season as the Zimbabwe Premier Soccer League top goalscorer. Upon his return to Platinum he went on trial to two South African teams, firstly to Chippa United and then to SuperSport United but he failed to win a contract with either side. After leaving Platinum, Mazivisa completed a move to Triangle United.

International
In January 2014, coach Ian Gorowa, invited him to be a part of the Zimbabwe squad for the 2014 African Nations Championship. He helped the team to a fourth-place finish after being defeated by Nigeria by a goal to nil. In total, Mazivisa has scored 4 goals in 8 caps for his nation.

Career statistics

International
.

International goals
. Scores and results list Zimbabwe's goal tally first.

Honours

Club
Platinum
 Zimbabwean Independence Trophy (2): 2012, 2014
 Cup of Zimbabwe (1): 2014

References

Living people
Zimbabwean footballers
Zimbabwe A' international footballers
2014 African Nations Championship players
1985 births
Association football forwards
Zimbabwe international footballers